Clinton Nathan Woolsey (November 30, 1904 — January 14, 1993) was an American neuroscientist notable for mapping the brain and exploring the location and inner workings of  touch, hearing, and vision.

Woolsey was the son of Joseph Woodhull and Mathilda Louise Aicholz Woolsey.

He was the Charles Sumner Slichter Emeritus Professor of Neurophysiology and professor at the University of Wisconsin–Madison,  
a member of the National Academy of Sciences,
a founder of Waisman Center on Mental Retardation and Human Development at the University of Wisconsin–Madison.

Awards
 In 1982 he was awarded the Ralph W. Gerard Prize in Neuroscience.

References 

1904 births
1993 deaths
University of Wisconsin–Madison faculty
American neuroscientists
Members of the United States National Academy of Sciences
Woodhull family
Woolsey family